Saline High School is a public, magnet high school near Saline, Michigan, United States. The school, a part of the Saline Area Schools, moved to its  facility on roughly 81 hectares (200 acres) of land on Industrial Drive in August 2004 in Pittsfield Township. It is the 54th largest high school in the state of Michigan by enrollment, and was ranked 5th best high school in the state by US News.

Extracurricular activities

Athletics
2017 Baseball State Champions
2015 Girls Soccer State Champions,
 2010, 2011, 2012 and 2013 Men's Swim and Dive State Champions
 2009, 2010 and 2014 Women's Swim and Dive State Champions
 2009 Girls Cross Country State Champions
 2006 Boys Golf State Champions
 2006, 2015 Boys Track State Champions
 1990, 1991 & 2010 Girls Golf State Champions
 1984 Women's Volleyball State Champions

Notable alumni

 Jennifer Allison, writer of mystery novels
 Chris Baker, National Football League player
 Bobby Korecky, Major League Baseball player
Taybor Pepper, National Football League player
 Bonnie Rideout, fiddler

References

External links

Saline High School

Public high schools in Michigan
Educational institutions established in 2004
Schools in Washtenaw County, Michigan
2004 establishments in Michigan